A fede ring is a ring in which two hands clasp, as if in friendship, love or betrothal. The design was used in Ancient Rome, maybe earlier. It became prominent in the Middle Ages, from the 12th century onward. The name "fede" is from the Italian phrase mani in fede ("hands clasped in faith").

See also
Claddagh ring

References

Rings (jewellery)
Wedding objects